George Maskill (4 October 1906 – 28 November 1969) was an English amateur footballer who played as a half-back in the Football League for York City and in non-League football for Acomb WMC, Scarborough and York Post Office. He was an England schoolboy international.

References

1906 births
Footballers from York
1969 deaths
English footballers
Association football midfielders
York City F.C. players
Scarborough F.C. players
Midland Football League players
English Football League players